The German Economic Review is a peer-reviewed academic journal of economics published quarterly by John Wiley & Sons on behalf of the Verein für Socialpolitik, of which it is an official journal. It was established in 2000. The current editors-in-chief are Almut Balleer, Jesus Crespo-Cuaresma, Peter Egger, Mario Larch, Jean-Marie Lozachmeur, Aderonke Osikominu, Georg Wamser, and Christine Zulehner.

According to the Journal Citation Reports, the journal has a 2020 impact factor of 0.860, ranking it 275th out of 373 journals in the category "Economics".

See also 
 List of economics journals
 List of political science journals

References

External links 
 

German economics journals
Quarterly journals
Wiley (publisher) academic journals
English-language journals
Publications established in 2000